Microbacterium terrae  is a bacterium from the genus of Microbacterium which has been isolated from soil in Osaka on Japan.

References 

 

Bacteria described in 1993
terrae